Veronica’s Wish is a Ugandan English-language drama film starring Nisha Kalema (Veronica), Housen Mushema (Michael), Malaika Nyanzi (Bankia) and Symon Base Kalema (Frank). It premiered in Uganda on 17 November 2018.

The film was selected at major film festivals around the world including Silcon Valley African Film Festival, Uganda Film Festival and Mashariki African Film Festival and even won nominations and awards at the latter two.

Plot
Michael and Veronica, a couple in love and engaged to marry are faced with challenges as Veronica gets hit by a mysterious illness a few days before their wedding.

Production and casting
When Nisha Kalema created Veronica’s Wish, she first cast Rehema Nanfuka as the lead actress to play Veronica. But when Rehema read the script, she turned down the offer and proposed the role be played by Nisha Kalema herself and instead offered to direct the movie.
During her speech at the movie premier, Nisha revealed that she hadn’t thought of casting Housen Mushema as Michael.
Malaika Nnyanzi was cast as Bankia, Veronica’s best friend and Frank’s (Symon Base Kalema) girlfriend. In reality, Malaika and Symon Base Kalema are siblings which led to the cutting of their on camera romance from the script.

Nominations and awards
In the first week of its screening, the film received 11 nominations at the Uganda Film Festival 2018 and later won 9 awards becoming the biggest winner.

References

External
 

Films set in Uganda
2018 films
Films shot in Uganda
English-language Ugandan films
2010s English-language films